The Cooby Dam is a rockfill embankment dam with an ungated spillway across the Cooby Creek, a tributary of Condamine River, at Groomsville in the Darling Downs region of Queensland, Australia. The main purpose of the dam is for potable water supply of the Toowoomba region. The impounded reservoir is called the Cooby Creek Reservoir.

Location and features
The other two storages used for Toowoomba are Perseverance Dam and Cressbrook Dam.
 
The  dam wall holds back the  reservoir when at full capacity. The dam is managed by the Toowoomba Region Council.

Cooby Dam's lowest usable storage volume was recorded at 8% in January 2010.

In July 2006, public outcry and a referendum with winning "No" vote rejected plans to place recycled water into Cooby Dam. In 2007, the idea was again resurrected when plans for an advanced water treatment plant to be built near Cooby Dam by the Toowoomba City Council were suggested. The trial would test the re-use of recycled water into Toowoomba's drinking water supply.
In 2008, an emergency bore was used to extract water from the Great Artesian Basin to supplement water supplies for the dam as drought conditions reduced supply to critical levels.

Recreational activities
A stocked impoundment permit is required to fish in the dam.

See also

List of dams in Queensland

References

Reservoirs in Queensland
Darling Downs
Dams in Queensland
Dams completed in 1942
1942 establishments in Australia
Embankment dams
Toowoomba